Punjabi Shaikh and Pakistani Sheikh or Shaikh are a branch of the Shaikhs in South Asia. In Punjab, the title shaikh was given to recent converts to Islam and not to those of Arab descent as a polite euphemism. 

The Shaikh caste were originally agricultural and can be found in the Faisalabad, Chiniot and Rawalpindi District regions of Punjab. However, in recent years, they have become urbanised and are involved in business and trade. The Punjabi Shaikh tribe are a wealthy but have a small population in the Punjab. Notable people include Sheikh Rasheed Ahmad, a Pakistani politician and a businessman.

Notable people with this surname
Sheikh Rasheed Ahmad, a Pakistani politician and a businessman
Javed Shaikh, a Pakistani actor and film director
Saleem Sheikh, a Pakistani actor
Shahnaz Sheikh, a Pakistani field hockey player
Shehnaz Sheikh, a Pakistani TV actress
Farooq Sheikh, an Indian film actor

See also 
 Qanungoh Shaikh
 Punjabi Saudagaran-e-Delhi
 Siddiqui
 Sindhi Shaikh
 Mian (surname)

References

Punjabi tribes
Shaikh clans
Social groups of Punjab, Pakistan